Micromonospora soli is a bacterium from the genus Micromonospora which has been isolated from rhizosphere soil from a rice field.

References

 

Micromonosporaceae
Bacteria described in 2016